BAE Systems Land Systems South Africa is a South African defence company and a subsidiary of BAE Systems Land Systems, itself part of BAE Systems Land and Armaments.

Land Systems South Africa is organised into three divisions: Land Systems OMC, Land Systems Gear Ratio, and Land Systems Dynamics.

Land Systems OMC 

Land Systems OMC is South Africa's primary military vehicle manufacturing company. OMC is the initialism under which the Olifant Manufacturing Company was most commonly known during its existence. It was established for the task of creating the Olifant tank for the South African Army.

Early into its life it was taken over by Reunert, which subsequently turned it into a division called Reumech OMC. It was under this name that OMC saw its most prolific level of vehicle development, as the SA Army's involvement in the Border War in Angola created a massive need for ever more advanced and capable vehicles.

Following South Africa's readmittance to the international arena following democratic elections in 1994, a number of foreign defence industry companies expressed significant interest in purchasing the company. In 1999 Britain's Vickers purchased the company and renamed it Vickers OMC. This continued until Alvis plc, also of Britain, purchased Vickers' defence division, including OMC. Alvis renamed the company to Alvis OMC.

The most recent chapter in the company's history was written in 2004, when BAE Systems purchased the military vehicle division of Alvis. OMC then became part of BAE Systems' Land Systems, again undergoing a name change to Land Systems OMC.

In April 2015, it was announced the company has sold its 75% stake in LSSA, for a total of approximately 855 million Rand ($53 million), to the state-owned group Denel.

Land Systems Gear Ratio 
Land Systems Gear Ratio manufactures specialised geartrain products, primarily for military vehicles, but also for mining and earthmoving equipment, industrial machinery and traction locomotives.

Land Systems Dynamics
On 16 April 2008 BAE Systems agreed to acquire IST Dynamics, a South African company based in Pretoria which specialises in the development of fire directing systems, remotely controlled turrets; weapon stations and related fire control sub-systems; products and fire control sub-systems-related training systems.

References

External links
Land Systems OMC
Land Systems Gear Ratio

BAE Systems subsidiaries and divisions
Defence companies of South Africa